The Abraham Lincoln National Heritage Area is a National Heritage Area in central Illinois telling the story of Abraham Lincoln. A National Heritage Area is a federal-designated area intended to encourage historic preservation and an appreciation of the history and heritage of the site. While National Heritage Areas are not federally owned or managed, the National Park Service  provides an advisory role and some technical, planning and financial assistance.

The Abraham Lincoln National Heritage Area was created as part of the Consolidated Natural Resources Act of 2008 (S. 2739), an omnibus bill. It was originally introduced in the Senate by Dick Durbin and in the House of Representatives by Ray LaHood, both from Illinois. The legislation also provided $10 million over 10 years, with no more than $1 million awarded in any single year, to make federal grants available for preservation, education and economic development. Grants awarded for Lincoln National Heritage Area activities must be matched dollar-for-dollar in state, local or private funds.

The management authority for the Abraham Lincoln National Heritage Area is the Looking for Lincoln Heritage Coalition and follows Lincoln's life from his birth and childhood, to his early life and career, to the Lincoln–Douglas debates of 1858.

The legislation protects private property rights and would not require any private citizen or entity to be affiliated with the Lincoln Heritage Area.  The bill names the Looking for Lincoln Heritage Coalition as the management authority for the National Heritage Area, but does not grant any zoning or land use power to the Coalition. Up to $10 million in federal grants would be available under this legislation

The Heritage Area includes the following sites:

 Lincoln Home National Historic Site
 Lincoln Tomb State Historic Site
 Lincoln's New Salem State Historic Site at New Salem, Menard County, Illinois
 Abraham Lincoln Presidential Library and Museum
 Lincoln Log Cabin State Historic Site
 Mount Pulaski Courthouse State Historic Site, Postville Courthouse State Historic Site and Metamora Courthouse State Historic Site
 Lincoln-Herndon Law Offices State Historic Site
 David Davis Mansion State Historic Site
 Vandalia State House State Historic Site
 Lincoln Douglas Debate Museum
 Macon County Log Court House
 Richard James Oglesby Mansion
 Lincoln Trail Homestead State Memorial
 John Wood Mansion
 Beardstown Courthouse
 Old Main at Knox College
 Carl Sandburg State Historic Site
 Bryant Cottage State Historic Site
 Dr. William Fithian Home
 Vermilion County Museum

References
http://www.lookingforlincoln.com/

 
National Heritage Areas of the United States
Abraham Lincoln
Lincoln family
National Park Service areas in Illinois
Protected areas established in 2008
2008 establishments in Illinois